The Experience of Literature: A Reader with Commentaries is an anthology of short stories and poems, divided into four parts, and edited in 1967 by Lionel Trilling of Columbia University. Published by Holt, Rinehart and Winston. Library of Congress Catalog Card Number 67–15654.

Part 1: Drama

Sophocles, Oedipus Rex
William Shakespeare, The Tragedy of King Lear
Henrik Ibsen, The Wild Duck
Anton Chekhov, The Three Sisters
George Bernard Shaw, The Doctor's Dilemma
Luigi Pirandello, Six Characters in Search of an Author: A Comedy in the Making
William Butler Yates, Purgatory
Bertolt Brecht, Galileo

Part 2: Fiction

Nathaniel Hawthorne, My Kinsman, Major Molineux
Herman Melville, "Bartleby the Scrivener: A Story of Wall Street"
Plus 20 more stories.

Part 3: Poetry

 "Lydicus"
 "Dover Beach"
 "Ode to a Nightinggale"
 "To His Coy Mistress"
 "Ode to the West Wind"
Plus many more poems

Part 4: Poetry for Further Reading

Contains over 200 poems

1967 anthologies
American poetry anthologies
Fiction anthologies
Holt, Rinehart and Winston books